Lofa-1 is an electoral district for the elections to the House of Representatives of Liberia. The constituency covers the northern parts of Foya District, i.e. the communities of Borliloe, Lepaloe, Ndehuma, Yelayaloe, Konkpama, Bandenin, Bandenin Melimu, Ndama, Foya, Fassapoe and Sinagole.

Elected representatives

References

Electoral districts in Liberia